Majete is a town in north-eastern Ethiopia.

Based on figures from the Central Statistical Agency in 2005, Karakore has an estimated total population of 10,859 of whom 5,553 were males and 5,306 were 
females. The 1994 census reported this town had a total population of 6,247 of whom 2,922 were males and 3,325 were females. It is one of two towns in Antsokiyana Gemza woreda.

Notes 

Populated places in the Amhara Region